The three Repeat Valiant-class submarines, sometimes known as the Churchill class, were nuclear-powered fleet submarines which served with the Royal Navy from the 1970s until the early 1990s.  The Churchill class was based on the older , but featured many internal improvements. 

The lead vessel was named after the former Prime Minister and First Lord of the Admiralty Winston Churchill.  was the most famous of the class, sinking the Argentinian cruiser  during the 1982 Falklands War. , this is the only instance of a nuclear-powered submarine of any nation sinking an enemy ship by torpedo.

Design

The Churchills carried a crew of 103 and had a full load displacement of 4,900 tons whilst dived. Like all nuclear-powered submarines the Churchill class could remain submerged almost indefinitely, with supplies of food being the only limiting factor. One Kelvin Type 1006 surface-search radar was fitted. The ships were built with a Type 2001 sonar array, but this was replaced in the late 1970s with a Type 2020 array and a Type 2026 towed array. Weapons included Mk VIII torpedoes, Mk 24 Tigerfish torpedoes, and Sub-Harpoon anti-ship missiles. Six  torpedo tubes fired from the bow.

HMS Churchill evaluated both the American Mark 48 torpedo and the UGM-84 Harpoon missile, though only the latter was adopted by the Royal Navy. She was decommissioned in 1990 and is laid up at Rosyth awaiting disposal.

In 1981  became the first British submarine to carry the Sub-Harpoon missile. She was decommissioned in 1992 and is at Devonport Dockyard serving as a museum ship.

Construction Programme

Service history
 was the most famous of the class, sinking the Argentinian cruiser  during the 1982 Falklands War. She did not fire again during the war, but provided valuable help to the British task force by using her monitoring equipment to track Argentine aircraft departing the mainland. After the war Conqueror returned to Faslane; the sinking of General Belgrano had provoked controversy in Britain and Conqueror was criticised for flying the Jolly Roger on returning to port, as Royal Navy submarines customarily did on returning after scoring a kill. She  the only nuclear-powered submarine of any nationality to have engaged an enemy ship with torpedoes. Conquerors periscopes can be viewed at the Royal Navy Submarine Museum in Gosport.

See also
 List of submarines of the Royal Navy

Cited footnotes

Submarine classes
 
Monuments and memorials to Winston Churchill